3070 may refer to:

In general
 3070, a number in the 3000 (number) range
 A.D. 3070, a year of the 4th millennium CE
 3070 BC, a year in the 4th millennium BCE

Roads numbered 3070
 Hawaii Route 3070, a state highway
 Louisiana Highway 3070, a state highway
 Pennsylvania State Route 3070 (Chester County, Pennsylvania), a state highway
 Texas Farm to Market Road 3070. a state highway

Other uses
 3070 Aitken, an asteroid in the Asteroid Belt, the 3070th asteroid registered
 Richard Davis (techno artist) (born 1952, stagename "3070"), U.S. musician
 GeForce RTX 3070, a videocard

See also